The Man in the Funny Suit is a television drama, originally broadcast on 15 April 1960 on Westinghouse Desilu Playhouse, detailing the agony endured by actor Keenan Wynn while helping his co-star, father and comedian Ed Wynn, play a serious role in the original television production of Rod Serling's Requiem for a Heavyweight, which had aired in 1956 on Playhouse 90.

Requiem was the elder Wynn's first dramatic role after decades of comedy. When Wynn flubbed a line or was uncertain of how to proceed, he would fall back on his old comedic catchphrases and jokes, mostly out of habit. As Requiem was an intense drama scheduled for live broadcast, this caused much consternation and worry among the staff and cast. When the time came for the show, however, Ed Wynn surprised everyone with his flawlessly heartfelt performance.

Both Wynns, Ned Glass, Maxie Rosenbloom, Playhouse 90 announcer Dick Joy, Ralph Nelson, Serling, and Red Skelton play themselves. Ralph Nelson, in addition to appearing in the production as himself, also wrote and directed The Man in the Funny Suit. Nelson was the director of both the 1956 original Playhouse 90 television staging of Requiem for a Heavyweight and the later 1962 movie version, which stars Jackie Gleason and Mickey Rooney in Keenan and Ed Wynn's roles, respectively.

Cast

External links
 

Films directed by Ralph Nelson
Films about actors
1960 films
1960 drama films
American drama television films
1960s American films